Anjum Sultana Sima is an Awami League politician and a member of the Bangladesh Parliament from a reserved seat.

Early life
Sultana was born on 28 September 1971. She has a B.Ed. degree. Her father, Afzal Khan, was a leader of Awami League.

Career
Sultana was nominated to contest the Comilla City mayoral election by Awami League in 2017. She lost the election to Monirul Haque Sakku. She lost in part due to internal conflicts in Awami League and lack of support from the local Awami League member of parliament AKM Bahauddin Bahar.

In 2019, Sultana was elected to parliament from reserved seat as a Awami League candidate.

References

Awami League politicians
Living people
Women members of the Jatiya Sangsad
11th Jatiya Sangsad members
21st-century Bangladeshi women politicians
21st-century Bangladeshi politicians
1971 births